Anthony Manny House is a historic home located at Hankins in Sullivan County, New York.  It was built in 1890 is a two-story, frame Queen Anne style dwelling.  It features irregular massing, a hipped roof core and intersecting gable projections and wings, a two-story polygonal bay, and a bluestone foundation and basement floor.  Also on the property are a garage and potting shed.

It was added to the National Register of Historic Places in 2000.

References

Houses on the National Register of Historic Places in New York (state)
Queen Anne architecture in New York (state)
Houses completed in 1890
Houses in Sullivan County, New York
National Register of Historic Places in Sullivan County, New York